This is a list of programming changes which occurred on Australian television in 2008. The list is arranged chronological order. Where more than one programming changed was made on the same date, those changes are listed alphabetically.

Changes to network affiliation
This is a list of programs which made their premiere on an Australian television network that had previously premiered on another Australian television network. The networks involved in the switch of allegiances are predominantly both free-to-air networks or both subscription television networks. Programs that have their free-to-air/subscription television premiere, after previously premiering on the opposite platform (free-to air to subscription/subscription to free-to air) are not included. In some cases, programs may still air on the original television network. This occurs predominantly with programs shared between subscription television networks.

Domestic

International

Free-to-air premieres
This is a list of programs which made their premiere on Australian free-to-air television that had previously premiered on Australian subscription television. Programs may still air on the original subscription television network.

Domestic

International

Subscription television premieres
This is a list programs which had their premiere on Australian subscription television that had previously premiered on free-to-air television. Programs may still air on the original free-to-air network.

Domestic

International

Returning this year

Ending this year

Notes

References

2008 in Australian television
Australian television-related lists